Elias Naderan is an Iranian economist and conservative politician who represented Tehran, Rey, Shemiranat and Eslamshahr electoral district in the Parliament of Iran from 2004 to 2016.

References 

1958 births
Living people
Members of the 7th Islamic Consultative Assembly
Members of the 8th Islamic Consultative Assembly
Members of the 9th Islamic Consultative Assembly
Deputies of Tehran, Rey, Shemiranat and Eslamshahr
Alliance of Builders of Islamic Iran politicians
Society of Devotees of the Islamic Revolution politicians
Society of Pathseekers of the Islamic Revolution politicians
Popular Front of Islamic Revolution Forces politicians